Zygaena aurata  is a species of moth in the family Zygaenidae. It is found in the Atlas mountains of Morocco. In Seitz it is described 
Z. aurata as a form (now species) of  favonia with glossy brass-yellow ground-colour: discovered in Julv in the Moroccan Atlas.

References

Moths described in 1905
Zygaena